Ri Gwang-sik (born March 5, 1970) is a North Korean boxer who won a bronze medal in the men's bantamweight (54 kg) category at the 1992 Summer Olympics in Barcelona. He also captured a bronze medal at the 1991 World Amateur Boxing Championships.

Olympic results 
Defeated Laszlo Bognar (Hungary) TKO 3 (1:00)
Defeated Sergio Reyes Jr. (United States) 15-8
Defeated Serafim Todorov (Bulgaria) 16-15
Lost to Wayne McCullough (Ireland) 16-21

References
Profile

1970 births
Living people
Bantamweight boxers
Boxers at the 1992 Summer Olympics
Olympic bronze medalists for North Korea
Olympic boxers of North Korea
Olympic medalists in boxing
Medalists at the 1992 Summer Olympics
Boxers at the 1998 Asian Games
North Korean male boxers
AIBA World Boxing Championships medalists
Asian Games competitors for North Korea